The Nokia 6250 is a mobile phone made by Nokia. It has been available since 2000. It is a more rugged version of the Nokia 6210 phone.  It has a monochrome graphic LCD display of resolution 96 x 60 pixels.  Its memory can hold up to 500 phone book records with up to three numbers per name, and up to 150 text messages (SMS). It was being sold mainly in Asia-Pacific markets.

References

See also
List of Nokia products
Nokia 6210

6250
Mobile phones introduced in 2000
Mobile phones with infrared transmitter